"Derailed" is the 16th episode from the dramedy series Ugly Betty, which aired on February 15, 2007. It was written by Cameron Litvack and directed by Jim Hayman.

Plot
A blizzard in New York City risks derailing Christina's plans to create a designer gown for a high-profile celebrity. Betty and Walter finally go their separate ways, but Betty's way to Henry's heart is stopped at the tracks by his visiting girlfriend, Charlie. Claire is suspected by Betty in Fey's death. Santos returns to prove to Justin that he can be a father. Daniel and Alexis become co-EICs at MODE, a move that makes Wilhelmina furious and suspicious.

Awards
Rebecca Romijn submitted this episode for consideration in the category of "Outstanding Supporting Actress in a Comedy Series" on her behalf for the 2007 Emmy Awards. Lucy Liu also chose this episode for submission in consideration of her work in the category of "Outstanding Guest Actress in a Comedy Series".

Contest
This episode was a tie-in with a contest in which Ashley Jensen's character, Christina, must come up a designer outfit that was created by viewers at home. The winning design was unveiled in this episode. On February 8, 2007 Ricardo Rodriguez of Fort Lauderdale, Florida was announced as the winner.

Also starring
Judith Light (Claire Meade) 
Christopher Gorham (Henry)
Kevin Alejandro (Santos)
Jayma Mays (Charlie)

Guest stars
Lucy Liu (Grace Chin)
Jerry O'Connell (Joel)

References

Ugly Betty (season 1) episodes
2007 American television episodes